Guds spelemän is Garmarna's second full-length album, released in 1996.  All songs except "Njaalkeme" (which is in Southern Sami) are sung in Swedish.

Reception
The reviewer for AllMusic wrote that Garmarna managed to keep a straight-faced approach at presenting the content of the songs, instead of in a way "that might even have disturbed the Brothers Grimm".

Track listing 

 "Herr Mannelig (Sir Mannelig)" – 6:22
 "Vänner och Fränder (Friends and Relatives)" – 5:11
 "Halling från Makedonien (Halling from Macedonia)" – 2:45
 "Min Man (My Husband)" – 4:20
 "Varulven (The Werewolf)" – 4:55
 "Hilla Lilla" – 6:19
 "Drew Drusnaar/Idag som igår (Today as Yesterday)" – 2:46
 "Njaalkeme (Hunger)" – 5:05
 "Herr Holger (Sir Holger)" – 4:58
 "Guds Spelemän (The Fiddlers of God)" – 5:27

References

Garmarna albums
1996 albums
Swedish-language albums